Oleksandr Serhiyovych Gvozdyk (also Hvozdyk; born 15 April 1987) is a Ukrainian professional boxer who competed from 2014 to 2019, before coming out of retirement again in 2023. He held the WBC and lineal light-heavyweight titles from 2018 to 2019. As an amateur, Gvozdyk won a bronze medal at the 2012 Olympics and a gold at the 2013 Summer Universiade.

Nicknamed "The Nail" as the Russian translation of Gvozdyk is nail, Gvozdyk's knockout-to-win ratio stands at 77.7%. He is part of the Ukrainian golden generation of boxing along with Vasiliy Lomachenko and Oleksandr Usyk.

Amateur career
Gvozdyk began boxing when he was 10, at the encouragement of his friends. As an amateur, he won gold in the light-heavyweight division at the 2008 World University Boxing Championship. He was a three-time national Ukrainian amateur champion, winning the title for the first time in 2009, beating Vyacheslav Shabranskyy in the final. He won the national title again in 2010, against Ivan Senay, and 2011, against Dmitro Buglakov.

At the 2009 World Amateur Boxing Championships, Gvozdyk beat two opponents before being edged out by German boxer Rene Krause. He also was eliminated in the third round at the 2010 European Amateur Boxing Championships. Gvozdyk won the EUBC Europe Cup in 2011, by stopping Ainar Karlson of Estonia.

At the 2011 World Amateur Boxing Championships Gvozdyk beat three fighters before falling to the 2009 world champion Egor Mekhontsev of Russia. By reaching the quarterfinals, Gvozdyk qualified for the 2012 Summer Olympics. Gvozdyk was a bronze medallist at the 2012 Summer Olympics. He defeated Belarusian Mikhail Dauhaliavets 18–10, Nicaraguan Osmar Bravo 18–6, and Algerian Abdelhafid Benchabla 19–17 before losing very controversially to Kazakh Adilbek Niyazymbetov on countback in the semifinals.

Gvozdyk participated in the World Series of Boxing between 2011 and 2013, winning 9 bouts and losing none. Gvozdyk rounded out his amateur career by winning gold at the 2013 Summer Universiade. He won by walkover in the final as Dmitry Bivol injured his hand in the semi-final and could not compete. Gvozdyk's exact amateur record is unknown, but he has said he had around 255 bouts and lost 30 of which, so he finished with a record of about 225–30.

Professional career

Rise up the ranks
Gvozdyk turned professional in 2014, signing with Top Rank. He won his debut, defeating Mike Montoya (5-2-1) via first-round KO on the undercard of Manny Pacquiao vs. Timothy Bradley II on 12 April 2014. In 2016, Gvozdyk challenged for the NABF light-heavyweight title against former world title challenger Nadjib Mohammedi (37-4), on the undercard of Manny Pacquiao vs. Timothy Bradley III. Gvozdyk dropped Mohammedi in the second round with a right hook. Mohammedi fell face first on the canvas and the referee waved the fight immediately, giving Gvozdyk his tenth straight win and his first professional title.

Gvozdyk made his first title defence against three-time world-title challenger Tommy Karpency (26-5-1) on 23 July 2016. After Karpency dropped Gvozdyk in the first round with an inside shot, Gvozdyk rallied and knocked Karpency out in the sixth round with a hook to the body. He then faced off against Isaac Chilemba (24-4-2) on 19 November 2016, on the undercard of Sergey Kovalev vs. Andre Ward. Gvozdyk started strong after Chilemba suffered an injury to his right hand. Chilemba started to increase the pace, but decided to retire at the end of the eight round due to his hand injury, giving Gvozdyk the win.

On 8 April 2017, Gvozdyk won a second regional title, claiming the NABO title with a round 3 TKO win over Yunieski Gonzalez (18-2). Later that year, the WBC ordered a world title eliminator between Gvozdyk and Marcus Browne, but Browne declined the fight. On 19 August, Gvozdyk defeated Craig Baker (17-1) by a 6th-round knockout on the undercard of Terence Crawford vs. Julius Indongo at the Pinnacle Bank Arena in Lincoln, Nebraska. Baker was coming off a year-long layoff to take the fight with Gvozdyk.

Gvozdyk won the WBC interim light-heavyweight title by dominating a 12-round bout on 17 March 2018 against former European light-heavyweight champion Mehdi Amar (34-5-2), and put himself in position to challenge Adonis Stevenson for the full WBC title. According to CompuBox, Gvozdyk landed 256 of 960 (27%) total punches, including 176 of 492 (36%) of his power shots. Amar landed 135 of 536 (25%) of his total shots, including 92 of 337 (27%) power shots.

WBC and lineal champion
On 1 December 2018, Gvozdyk knocked out Adonis Stevenson (29-2-1, 24 KO) at 2:49 of the 11th round to win the WBC and lineal championship, ending a reign that began in 2013. Gvozdyk knocked Stevenson down in the third round, but the referee called it as a slip. Stevenson hurt Gvozdyk with a few strong shots in the 9th and 10th rounds, particularly a left hand in the 10th which almost dropped Gvozdyk. But Gvozdyk rallied and after a 10-punch combination finished with a straight right he put Stevenson down hard in the 11th round. The referee waved the fight without a count as Stevenson was clearly unconscious. Stevenson was hospitalised after the bout with a life-threatening brain injury, and was put in an induced coma for three weeks. Gvozdyk said he does not want to be "known as a killer" and has wished Stevenson a strong recovery.

On 30 March 2019, Gvozdyk faced Doudou Ngumbu (38-8, 14 KOs) in his first defense of his WBC and lineal titles. Gvozdyk started the bout as the aggressor by peppering Ngumbu with short right and left hands, before landing a punishing overhand right. By the third round, Gvozdyk appeared to be getting into a rhythm, as he connected on a straight right hand followed by a left hook. Ngumbu fought back, firing off a hard combination of his own to the body. Near the end of the fourth round, Gvozdyk upped the work rate on his jab to set up a three-punch combination. Early In the fifth round, Ngumbu's right calf gave out on him. Despite the injury not being the result of a foul, the referee gave Ngumbu five minutes to try to recover. Ngumbu tried to walk around the ring, but continued to have a limp, and the bout was called off as a TKO victory for Gvozdyk.

Unification fight Gvozdyk vs. Beterbiev
After the Ngumbu bout, Top Rank set to work on a unification fight between Gvozdyk and IBF light-heavyweight champion Artur Beterbiev for some time in Autumn 2019 on ESPN. The winner of Gvozdyk vs. Beterbiev would hold two of the four world titles at 175, and set up further unification matches. The two-time Russian Olympian Beterbiev (14-0, 14 KOs) had arguably been avoided by the other top fighters in the 175 pound division as he is a fearsome opponent but did not have name recognition among most fans. In July it was announced that the fight would be on 18 October, at the Liacouras Center in Philadelphia.

At the end of the first round, Gvozdyk was on the canvas. The referee called it as a knockdown, as the crowd was booing. There was an instant replay call that overturned the knockdown to a push. The fight was competitive, with Gvozdyk's accurate punching countering Beterbiev's pressure, but Gvozdyk began to fade as the fight went on. In the 9th round, Beterbiev took control of the fight, and had Gvozdyk struggling to stay on his feet. Gvozdyk survived the round but was visibly fatigued coming into the 10th. Beterbiev applied the pressure in the 10th and Gvozdyk took a knee early in the round. He got up but soon went down again after another flurry from Beterbiev, and the referee warned that another knockdown would mean the end of the fight. After another exchange where Beterbiev came out on top, Gvozdyk took a knee once more, resulting in a TKO victory for Beterbiev. Gvozdyk was leading on the scorecards at the time of stoppage, with two judges seeing the fight 87–83, 86-85 for Gvozdyk, and one judge seeing it 83-87 for Beterbiev. After the bout, Gvozdyk was hospitalised as he said he felt a pain in the back of his head. It was feared that he had suffered a brain bleed, but testing revealed it was only a mild concussion due to the strikes to the back of the head he experienced during the fight. He was released from hospital after two days.

Personal life 

Gvozdyk was born in Kharkiv, Ukraine, as an only child. His father was an amateur boxer. Gvozdyk is married and has three children, two sons and a daughter.

Professional boxing record

References

External links
 
 
 Oleksandr Gvozdyk profile at Top Rank
Oleksandr Gvozdyk - Profile, News Archive & Current Rankings at Box.Live
 Oleksandr Gvozdyk and crime in Ukraine and the USA bmmagazine

1987 births
Sportspeople from Kharkiv
World light-heavyweight boxing champions
World Boxing Council champions
Living people
Olympic boxers of Ukraine
Boxers at the 2012 Summer Olympics
Olympic bronze medalists for Ukraine
Olympic medalists in boxing
Medalists at the 2012 Summer Olympics
Ukrainian male boxers
Ukrainian expatriates in the United States
Universiade medalists in boxing
Universiade gold medalists for Ukraine
Light-heavyweight boxers